Aguada Cecilio is a village and municipality in the Valcheta Department in Río Negro Province in the Patagonian region of Argentina.

Services
With a small population of 119 inhabitants (INDEC, 2001), the town is dedicated to raising sheep, goats, cows and horses, politically driven by a development commission. There is general insurance business. It has no gas station.

Access
Aguada Cecilio is to the side of National Route 23 at some 35 km from Valcheta.

Facilities
Aguada Cecilio has, in addition to public buildings, a clinic, a police station and a primary school (still without a permanent residence) attended by children of the area.

References

Populated places in Río Negro Province